Medal of the Republic is a 2021 Chinese eight-part anthology biographical drama television series, consisting of eight segments directed by eight directors, Zheng Xiaolong (also chief director), Lin Nan, and . It stars many of China's top actors, many in supporting roles and cameos. The series follows the stories of the first group of eight recipients (Yu Min, Huang Xuhua, Shen Jilan, Sun Jiadong, Tu Youyou and Yuan Longping) of the Medal of the Republic, China's highest honor for those who have made great contributions to the development of the People's Republic of China. Medal of the Republic is also a production to celebrate the 100th Anniversary of the Chinese Communist Party. The series was aired on Zhejiang Television, Dragon Television, Beijing Television and Jiangsu Television on 26 September 2021.

Synopsis

Li Yannian

Yu Min
The episode on Yu Min, a nuclear physicist, is about how he overcome obstacles and make breakthroughs in hydrogen bomb research after several months of undertaking complex calculations.

Zhang Fuqing

Huang Xuhua
The episode on Huang Xuhua, picks up his efforts to develop China's first nuclear submarine between 1952 and 1988.

Shen Jilan
The episode on Shen Jilan, a delegate to the National People's Congress, highlights her efforts to defend women's labor rights and advocate for the inclusion of "equal pay for equal work" between men and women in the Constitution.

Sun Jiadong
The episode on Sun Jiadong, sees his efforts to develop China's first space satellite, Dong Fang Hong I, in the 1960s.

Tu Youyou
The episode on Tu Youyou, a Nobel Prize winner, focuses on her efforts to develop artemisinin in the 1970s, which is used to treat malaria.

Yuan Longping
The episode on Yuan Longping, an agronomist, is about how he develops the first hybrid rice varieties

Cast

Li Yannian (directed by Mao Weining)

Yu Min (directed by Shen Yan)
 Lei Jiayin as Yu Min, a nuclear physicist, recipient of Two Bombs, One Satellite Achievement Medal, known as the "Father of Chinese Hydrogen Bomb".
 Ni Ni as Sun Yuqin, wife of Yu Min.
 Yang Shuo as Lao Ma
  as Lu Jie
  as Lao Hao
  as Yuan Jinhong
 Bai Fan as Doctor Sun
 You Yong as Deputy Minister
 Hu Ke as Yu Su

Zhang Fuqing (directed by Kang Honglei)
  as Sun Yulan, wife of Zhang Fuqing.
  as Peng Dehuai

Huang Xuhua (directed by Yang Yang)
 Huang Xiaoming as Huang Xuhua, chief designers for China's first generation of nuclear submarines (Type 091 and Type 092).
 Chen Hao as Li Shiying, wife of Huang Xuhua.
  as Chun Ling
 Ai Liya as Director Liu

Shen Jilan (directed by Lin Nan)
 Jiang Xin as Shen Jilan, delegate to the National People's Congress.
 Chen He as Li Chengying, husband of Shen Jilan.
 Zuo Xiaoqing as Li Hua
  as Zhang Hailiang
 Liu Yuning as a correspondent
  as a journalist
  as mother of Xiu Zhi
  as battalion commander
 Jian Renzi as Xiu Zhi
 Lin Siyi as Lai Di
  as Li Guiying
  as Shitou

Sun Jiadong (directed by Yang Wenjun)
 Tong Dawei as Sun Jiadong, father of China's carrier rocket and satellite technology.
 Sun Li as Wei Suping, wife of Sun Jiadong.
 Liu Yijun as Qian Xuesen
  as Chen Xiyuan
  as Huang Zhiming
 Lin Yongjian as Nie Rongzhen
 Liu Jing as Zhou Enlai
  as Chen Qian
  as Li Donghai

Tu Youyou (directed by Zheng Xiaolong)
 Zhou Xun as Tu Youyou, pharmaceutical chemist and malariologist who discovered artemisinin and dihydroartemisinin, used to treat malaria, a breakthrough in twentieth-century tropical medicine, saving millions of lives in South China, Southeast Asia, Africa, and South America.
 Zhang Songwen as Li Tingzhao, husband of Tu Youyou.
 Chen Baoguo as Doctor Liao
 Xi Meijuan as mother of Tu Youyou
 Yu Rongguang as Zhang Jianguang
  as Lü Chuanzhi

Yuan Longping (directed by Yan Jiangang)
 Huang Zhizhong as Yuan Longping, agronomist, known for developing the first hybrid rice varieties.
 Dong Jie as Deng Zhe, wife of Yuan Longping.
  as Tan Panggong
 Jiang Mengjie as Tian Hehua

Reception
Douban, a major Chinese media rating site, gave the drama 9.1 out of 10.

References

External links
 
 

2021 Chinese television series debuts
2021 Chinese television series endings
Chinese period television series